Mohammed Jaffar Ali Ahmed Al-Zain (born 13 November 1979) is a Bahraini former footballer who played as a striker for Bahrain in the 2004 AFC Asian Cup.

References

1979 births
Living people
Bahraini footballers
Bahrain international footballers
Association football forwards
Footballers at the 2002 Asian Games
Asian Games competitors for Bahrain
2004 AFC Asian Cup players
Al-Muharraq SC players
Al-Shabab Club (Manama) players